Two male athletes from Saudi Arabia competed at the 2000 Summer Paralympics in Sydney, Australia.

See also
Saudi Arabia at the Paralympics
Saudi Arabia at the 2000 Summer Olympics

References 

Nations at the 2000 Summer Paralympics
2000
Summer Paralympics